Nazima (25 March 1948; née Mehr-un-Nissa) is a  Bollywood actress who was most famous for her roles as supporting actress in films in 1960s and early 1970s. She was born in Nashik (Maharashtra) and was known as the "Resident Sister" of Bollywood.

Early life
Nazima was born as Mehr-un-Nisa on 25 March 1948 in Nasik. She was related to actresses Sharifa Bai (of 1930s) and Husn Bano (of 1940s) who happened to be her grandmother and aunt respectively. She was admitted to a high school in Mumbai (then Bombay) and being from a filmy background, she was soon cast as a child artist by the name Baby Chand in her early films.

Career
Nazima started her career as a child artist in 1954 with Biraj Bahu. By 1958, she made her debut as a heroine in stunt film Princess Saaba. She went into mainstream cinema in 1961 with Umar Qaid which was directed by filmmaker Aspi Irani who was also her uncle. Then came Ziddi (1964) directed by Pramod Chakravarty, a hit. There was then Arzoo (1965) produced and directed by Ramanand Sagar, a silver jubilee runner. She won the best supporting actress award for the acting in Arzoo from the Bengal Film Journalists’ Association. Then came April Fool (1964) directed by Subodh Mukerjee which was appreciated by millions. She then acted in J. Om Prakash's Aye Din Bahar Ke (1968), which celebrated silver jubilee at many places. She also acted in Gemini's Aurat (1967), another box-office hit. In between she had acted in Vidyapati (1964) as heroine opposite veteran Bharat Bhushan. This was a Hindi picture made in Calcutta. In a 1968 interview, Nazima said that to her it was the best role of her film career containing all facets — humor, romance and emotion. However, the picture failed at the box office. She also acted in another Hindi film, Wohi Ladki (1967), produced in Calcutta opposite a newcomer Sharvendra as hero.

She was nominated in the Filmfare Best Supporting Actress Category for playing Manoj Kumar's sister in the 1972 film Beimaan. Songs picturised on her include "Ae Kash Kisi Deewane Ko" from Aaye Din Bahar Ke and "Hum behanon ke Liye" from the 1969 film Anjaana.

Filmography

Awards and nominations 
1965: Bengal Film Journalists Association Awards - Best Supporting Actress (Hindi), Arzoo (1965)
1972 - Filmfare nomination as Best Supporting Actress for Beimaan

References

External links
 

Indian film actresses
Place of birth missing
1946 births
1975 deaths